The David W. Campbell House is a historic house on Main Street in Cherryfield, Maine.  Built in 1828 as a Federal-style structure, it was altered in the mid-19th century to include a significant number of Italianate features.  Built by a member of the locally prominent Campbell family, it was listed on the National Register of Historic Places in 1990 for its architectural significance, and is a contributing member of the 1990 Cherryfield Historic District.

Description and history
The Campbell House is set on the east side of Main Street, just south of the public library.  The main block is a -story wood-frame structure, five bays wide, with a side-gable roof that has a center gable at the front, twin end chimneys, and a square cupola.  A long series of ells lengthen the house to the rear (east).  Most of the house is finished in wood clapboards; the front is finished in flushboard.  The entrance is centered on the western facade, sheltered by a hip-roof porch with turned posts and a spindled frieze.  The front and side gables are fully pedimented, with round-arch windows within the field.  A porch on the south side features Italianate brackets and chambered posts.  The interior retains a significant amount of Federal period woodwork, but the dining room was clearly updated in the mid-19th century.

The main block was built in 1828 by David W. Campbell, a descendant of General Alexander Campbell, a prominent local citizen during the American Revolutionary War.  The ells and much of the Italianate styling were added in the mid-19th century, and the front porch, whose styling is more Queen Anne, was probably added in the late 19th century.

See also
National Register of Historic Places listings in Washington County, Maine

References

Houses on the National Register of Historic Places in Maine
Federal architecture in Maine
Italianate architecture in Maine
Houses completed in 1828
Houses in Washington County, Maine
Cherryfield, Maine
National Register of Historic Places in Washington County, Maine
Historic district contributing properties in Maine